McCormack Island is a northern Canadian island in eastern Hudson Bay. While situated close to the western coast of Quebec's Ungava Peninsula, the island is a part of Qikiqtaaluk Region in the territory of Nunavut.

References

Islands of Hudson Bay
Uninhabited islands of Qikiqtaaluk Region